The English cricket team's tour to Australia in 1903–04 was the first time the Marylebone Cricket Club (MCC) took over responsibility for sponsoring and arranging an overseas tour representing England. England had not won the Ashes since the 1896 series in England. The MCC appointed Plum Warner to put together and captain a team, which was very much seen as the underdogs against Australia. Warner and his team, however, pulled off the upset the English were looking for and won the five-Test series 3–2. In the first Test at Sydney, R.E. "Tip" Foster scored 287 to set the world record for the highest individual Test innings; the innings remains the highest by a Test debutant.

Test series

First Test

Second Test

Third Test

Fourth Test

{{Two-innings cricket match
| date = 26 February – 3 March 1904(Timeless Test)
| team1 = 
| team2 = 

| score-team1-inns1 = 249 (114.1 overs)
| runs-team1-inns1 = AE Knight 70*
| wickets-team1-inns1 = MA Noble 7/100 (41.1 overs)

| score-team2-inns1 = 131 (51.3 overs)
| runs-team2-inns1 = RA Duff 47
| wickets-team2-inns1 = EG Arnold 4/28 (14.3 overs)

| score-team1-inns2 = 210 (99.3 overs)
| runs-team1-inns2 = TW Hayward 52
| wickets-team1-inns2 = A Cotter 3/41 (18.3 overs)

| score-team2-inns2 = 171 (72.5 overs)
| runs-team2-inns2 = MA Noble 53*
| wickets-team2-inns2 = BJT Bosanquet 6/51 (15 overs)

| result = England won by 157 runs
| report = Scorecard
| venue = Sydney Cricket Ground, Sydney
| umpires = P Argall and RM Crockett
| toss = England won the toss and elected to bat.
| rain = 28 February was taken as a rest day.There was no play on the third day| notes = PA McAlister and A Cotter (both AUS) made their Test debuts.
}}

Fifth Test

Tour matches

South Australia v M.C.C.

Victoria v M.C.C.

New South Wales v M.C.C.

Queensland v M.C.C.

Northern District XVIII v M.C.C.

Newcastle XV v M.C.C.

Melbourne Colts XVIII v M.C.C.

Bendigo and District XVIII v M.C.C.

Ballarat XVIII v M.C.C.

Tasmania v M.C.C.

Tasmania v M.C.C.

Victoria v M.C.C.

New South Wales v M.C.C.

Western District XV v M.C.C.

South Australia v M.C.C.

References

External sources
 CricketArchive match lists

Further reading
 H S Altham, A History of Cricket, Volume 1 (to 1914), George Allen & Unwin, 1962
 Bill Frindall, The Wisden Book of Test Cricket 1877–1978, Wisden, 1979
 David Frith, The Golden Age of Cricket 1890–1914, Lutterworth, 1978
 Chris Harte, A History of Australian Cricket, Andre Deutsch, 1993
 Plum Warner, How We Recovered The Ashes, Longman, 1905
 Roy Webber, The Playfair Book of Cricket Records'', Playfair Books, 1951
 Wisden Cricketers' Almanack 1905

1903 in Australian cricket
1903 in English cricket
1904 in Australian cricket
1904 in English cricket
Australian cricket seasons from 1890–91 to 1917–18
1903-04
International cricket competitions from 1888–89 to 1918
1903-04